Lasak (also Romanized as Lāsak) is a village in Chubar Rural District, Ahmadsargurab District, Shaft County, Gilan Province, Iran. At the 2006 census, its population was 773, in 214 families.

References 

Populated places in Shaft County